= Kilawala Mohra =

- Union council
- Location within Pakistan
- Coordinates: 33.24°N 73.25°E
- Country: Pakistan
- Province: (Islamabad Capital Territory) Islamabad C.T
- Elevation: 509 m (1,670 ft)

Population
  - Total: 96,082
- Time zone: UTC+5 (PST)

Kilawala Mohra is a union council in the Islamabad Capital Territory of Pakistan. It is located at 33° 24' 10N 73° 25' 25E with an altitude of 509 metres (1673 feet).
